Jenovéfa Boková (born 16 May 1992) is a Czech actress and violinist. At the 2018 Czech Lion Awards she won the category of Best Actress, for her performance in the film . For her performance in the 2013 film Revival, she received a nomination for Best Supporting Actress at the 2013 Czech Lions, but the winner was announced as Jaroslava Pokorná. She is the daughter of political activist  and younger sister of Czech actress .

Selected filmography 
Identity Card (2010)
Burning Bush (2013)
Revival (2013)
Family Film (2015)
Green Horse Rustlers (2016)
 (2018)

Awards and nominations

References

External links

1992 births
Living people
Czech violinists
Czech film actresses
Czech stage actresses
Czech television actresses
Actresses from Prague
20th-century Czech actresses
21st-century Czech actresses
Czech Lion Awards winners